José Ignacio de Cavero y Cárdenas (29 June 1757 – 17 August 1834) was a Mexican-Colombian lawyer and politician. A Precursor of the Independence of Colombia, as the 4th President of the Supreme Junta of Cartagena de Indias he was a signatory of the declaration of independence of the Cartagena Province from the Viceroyalty of the New Granada and the Kingdom of Spain, establishing a republic based in the concept of separation of powers, and abolishing the Tribunal of the Holy Office of the Inquisition. Cartagena would eventually join with other provinces to create the Republic of Colombia under President Simón Bolívar, and was appointed in 1824 by Vice President Francisco de Paula Santander y Omaña to serve as the 3rd Prefect Intendant of the Magdalena River and the Isthmus province, which now encompassed the former province of Cartagena as well as the provinces of Santa Marta, Riohacha, and the Isthmus.

Personal life
Born on 29 June 1757 in Mérida, Yucatán then part of the Viceroyalty of New Spain, his parents were Diego Cavero Castro and Juana de Díaz Cárdenas.

References

External links
 Declaration of Independence of Cartagena

1757 births
1834 deaths
People from Mérida, Yucatán
Colombian people of Mexican descent
18th-century Colombian lawyers
People of the Colombian War of Independence